Oscar Danielson is a Swedish pop folk indie singer-songwriter who released his first CD independently in 1996 called Schysst & Populär. He worked with Slutsåld label. He has gained fame through a number of melodious songs. He released his 2012 album Fina år 1996-2012 in October 2012, a compilation of many of his songs.

Danielson has also authored three books.

Discography
Studio albums

CDs
1996: Schysst & Populär
1998: Gitarren är mitt svärd
2004: Att vara vacker är modernt igen
2005: Sårskorpor (Album and Teatermusik)
2007: En bild av lycka att spara på
2011: Stockholm i mitt hjärta
2011: Det kostar på att vara barn

EPs
2003: Det kan vara ett problem, för mig, ibland det där

Singles
1996: "Schysst & populär"
1996: "Time out"
1998: "Barbro och Gunnar"
1998: "Hallands floder"
1999: "Årets märkligaste dag"
1999: "Årets märkligaste dag" (Promo)
2004: "Du roar mig" (Promo)
2004: "Kudden"

Books
2002: Siljans konditori
2006: Johannas Backe
2008: Dagmar

References

External links
Official website
Myspace
Twitter

Swedish male singers
Swedish songwriters
Living people
Year of birth missing (living people)